It was the eighth season of the Vietnam Futsal League, the Vietnam professional futsal league for association football clubs.
This season is hold by VFF and VOV Channel. The main sponsorship of this season are HD Bank and Cityland.

Teams changes

Former clubs
 V&V Quảng Nam
 BV An Phước Bình Thuận

New clubs
 Kim Toàn Đà Nẵng
 Sanest Tourist Khánh Hòa

Rule changes
In this season, there are 2 stages. At the end of the First stage, 4 of 5 teams will be qualified to the Second stage, where we have 10 teams (6 automatic qualifications and 4 qualifications). The champion will be qualified to AFC Futsal Club Championship, while the runner-up will be qualified to AFF Futsal Club Championship.

First stage
All matches are held in Quân Khu 5 Arena, Đà Nẵng from 17 February 2017 to 31 February 2017.

League table

Results

Second stage
All matches are held in Quân Khu 7 Arena, Hồ Chí Minh City from 8 April to 24 June 2017.

League table

Results

Season awards
 Champion : Thái Sơn Nam (200,000,000 VND)
 Runner-up : Sanatech Khánh Hòa (100,000,000 VND)
 Third place : HPN Phú Nhuận (60,000,000 VND)
 Fair-play award : HPN Phú Nhuận (30,000,000 VND)
 Best player : Phạm Đức Hòa (Thái Sơn Nam) (10,000,000 VND)
 Best goalkeeper : Nguyễn Hoàng Anh (Sanatech Khánh Hòa) (10,000,000 VND)
 Top scorer : Mai Thành Đạt (Sanna Khánh Hòa, 15 goals) (10,000,000 VND)

References

External links
Official Page

2